Kennedy Road may refer to:

Roads

Canada
Kennedy Road, a numbered roads in Peel Region, Ontario
Kennedy Road (Toronto), also through Markham, Whitchurch-Stouffville, & East Gwillimbury, Ontario

Elsewhere
Kennedy Avenue, Turkey
Kennedy Road, Durban, South Africa
Kennedy Road, Hong Kong
Kennedy Expressway, Chicago, United States
Kennedy Highway, Queensland, Australia
Kennedytunnel, Antwerp, Belgium

Horses
Kennedy Road (horse), a thoroughbred racehorse
Kennedy Road Stakes, a Canadian Thoroughbred horse race